The 1824 United States presidential election was the tenth quadrennial presidential election. It was held from Tuesday, October 26 to Thursday, December 2, 1824. Andrew Jackson, John Quincy Adams, Henry Clay and William Crawford were the primary contenders for the presidency. The result of the election was inconclusive, as no candidate won a majority of the electoral vote. In the election for vice president, John C. Calhoun was elected with a comfortable majority of the vote. Because none of the candidates for president garnered an electoral vote majority, the U.S. House of Representatives, under the provisions of the Twelfth Amendment, held a contingent election. On February 9, 1825, the House voted (with each state delegation casting one vote) to elected John Quincy Adams as president.

The Democratic-Republican Party had won six consecutive presidential elections and by 1824 was the only national political party. However, as the election approached, the presence of multiple viable candidates resulted in there being multiple nominations by the contending factions, signaling the splintering of the party and an end to the Era of Good Feelings.

Adams won New England, Jackson and Adams split the mid-Atlantic states, Jackson and Clay split the Western states, and Jackson and Crawford split the Southern states. Jackson finished with a plurality of the popular vote and the electoral vote, due to the Three-fifths Compromise, while the other three candidates each finished with a significant share of the votes. Clay, who had finished fourth, was eliminated. 

This is one of two presidential elections (along with the 1800 election) that have been decided in the House. It is also one of five elections in which the winner did not achieve at least a plurality of the national popular vote and the only election in which the candidate who received the most electoral votes from the Electoral College did not win the election.

Background
The Era of Good Feelings, associated with the administration of President James Monroe, was a time of reduced emphasis on political party identity. With the Federalists discredited, Democratic-Republicans adopted some key Federalist economic programs and institutions. The economic nationalism of the Era of Good Feelings that would authorize the Tariff of 1816 and incorporate the Second Bank of the United States portended abandonment of the Jeffersonian political formula for strict construction of the Constitution, limited central government, and primacy of Southern slaveholding interests.

An unintended consequence of wide single-party identification was reduced party discipline. Rather than political harmony, factions arose within the party. Monroe attempted to improve discipline by appointing leading statesmen to his Cabinet, including Secretary of State John Quincy Adams of Massachusetts, Secretary of the Treasury William H. Crawford of Georgia, and Secretary of War John C. Calhoun of South Carolina. General Andrew Jackson of Tennessee led high-profile military missions. Only House Speaker Henry Clay of Kentucky held political power independent of Monroe. He refused to join the cabinet and remained critical of the administration.

Two key events, the Panic of 1819 and the Missouri crisis of 1820, influenced and reshaped politics. The economic downturn broadly harmed workers, the sectional disputes over slavery expansion raised tensions, and both events plus other factors drove demand for increased democratic control. Social disaffection would help motivate revival of rivalrous political parties in the near future, though these had not yet formed at the time of the 1824 election.

Nomination process
The previous competition between the Federalist Party and the Democratic-Republican Party collapsed after the War of 1812 due to the disintegration of the Federalists' popular appeal. President James Monroe of the Democratic-Republicans was able to run without opposition in the 1820 election. Like previous presidents who had been elected to two terms, Monroe declined to seek re-nomination for a third term. Vice President Daniel D. Tompkins had long-since been dismissed as a viable successor to Monroe due to a combination of health problems and a financial dispute with the federal government, and he formally ruled himself out of making a presidential run at the start of 1824. The presidential nomination was thus left wide open within the Democratic-Republican Party, the only major national political entity remaining in the United States.

The Congressional caucus nominated Crawford for president and Albert Gallatin for vice president, but only 66 of the 240 Democratic Republican members of Congress attended the caucus and was widely attacked as undemocratic. Gallatin had not sought the vice presidential nomination and soon withdrew at Crawford's request. Gallatin was also dissatisfied with repeated attacks on his credibility made by the other candidates. He was replaced by North Carolina Senator Nathaniel Macon. State legislatures also convened state caucuses to nominate candidates.

Adams sought to have Jackson be his vice-presidential running mate and Louisa Adams hosted a ball in honor of the Battle of New Orleans' ninth anniversary. He had supported Jackson during his invasion of Florida while Clay and Crawford opposed him, causing Jackson to oppose them. Clay supporters in the Tennessee legislature nominated Jackson for president in 1822, as an attempt to weaken Crawford in the state.

Martin Van Buren and his political machine supported Crawford in New York. During the selection of New York's electors Van Buren was able to deny Clay enough support to prevent him from being eligible for the contingent election.

General election

Candidates who withdrew before election

Candidates

All four candidates were nominated by at least one state legislature. Andrew Jackson was recruited to run for the office of the president by the state legislature of Tennessee. Jackson did not seek the task of running for president. Instead, he wished to retire to his estate on the outskirts of Nashville called the Hermitage. However, Jackson was not one to decline such a request.

Campaign 
Candidates drew voter support by different states and sections. Adams dominated the popular vote in New England and won some support elsewhere, Clay dominated his home state of Kentucky and won pluralities in two neighboring states, and Crawford won the Virginia vote overwhelmingly and polled well in North Carolina. Jackson had geographically the broadest support, though there were heavy vote concentrations in his home state of Tennessee and in Pennsylvania and populous areas where even he ran poorly.

Policy played a reduced role in the election, though positions on tariffs and internal improvements did create significant disagreements. Both Adams and Jackson supporters backed Secretary of War John C. Calhoun of South Carolina for vice president. He easily secured the majority of electoral votes for that office. In reality, Calhoun was vehemently opposed to nearly all of Adams's policies, but he did nothing to dissuade Adams supporters from voting for him for vice president, partly because he was even more vehemently opposed to the prospect of a Clay presidency, and partly because he had a long-standing personal enmity with Crawford.

The campaigning for presidential election of 1824 took many forms. Contrafacta, or well known songs and tunes whose lyrics have been altered, were used to promote political agendas and presidential candidates. Below can be found a sound clip featuring "Hunters of Kentucky", a tune written by Samuel Woodsworth in 1815 under the title "The Unfortunate Miss Bailey". Contrafacta such as this one, which promoted Andrew Jackson as a national hero, have been a long-standing tradition in presidential elections. Another form of campaigning during this election was through newsprint. Political cartoons and partisan writings were best circulated among the voting public through newspapers. Presidential candidate John C. Calhoun was one of the candidates most directly involved through his participation in the publishing of the newspaper The Patriot as a member of the editorial staff. This was a sure way to promote his own political agendas and campaign. In contrast, most candidates involved in early 19th century elections did not run their own political campaigns. Instead it was left to volunteer citizens and partisans to speak on their behalf.

Results
The 1824 presidential election marked the final collapse of the Republican-Federalist political framework. The electoral map confirmed the candidates' sectional support, with Adams winning in New England, Jackson having wide voter appeal, Clay attracting votes from the West, and Crawford attracting votes from the eastern South. Jackson earned only a plurality of electoral votes. Thus, the presidential election was decided by the House of Representatives, which elected John Quincy Adams on the first ballot. John C. Calhoun, supported by Adams and Jackson, easily won the vice presidency, not requiring a contingent election in the Senate.

Jackson's electoral college plurality was the result of the Three-fifths Compromise. The electoral college results would have been 83 for Adams and 77 for Jackson without the inflated electoral count of slaveholding states. Crawford likewise benefited in this regard, as all but eight of his electoral votes were from slave states, while Clay's electoral votes were split relatively evenly (20 from the free states of New York and Ohio, 17 from the slave states of Kentucky and Missouri); without the Three-fifths Compromise, Crawford would have finished last in the electoral college, and Clay would have entered the contingent election at his expense.

Results by state

Vice presidential electoral vote breakdown by ticket

Close states

States where the margin of victory was under 1%:
 Maryland 0.32% (109 votes)

States where the margin of victory was under 5%:
 Ohio 1.53% (766 votes)

States where the margin of victory was under 10%:
 Illinois 5.23% (244 votes)

1825 contingent election
As no presidential candidate had won an absolute electoral vote majority, the responsibility for electing a new president devolved upon the U.S. House of Representatives, which held a contingent election on February 9, 1825. As prescribed by the Twelfth Amendment, the House was limited to choosing from among the three candidates who received the most electoral votes: Andrew Jackson, John Quincy Adams, and William Crawford; Henry Clay, who had finished fourth, was eliminated. Each state delegation, voting en bloc, had a single vote. There were 24 states at the time, thus an absolute majority of 13 votes was required for victory.

Clay detested Jackson and had said of him, "I cannot believe that killing 2,500 Englishmen at New Orleans qualifies for the various, difficult, and complicated duties of the Chief Magistracy." Moreover, Clay's American System was closer to Adams's position on tariffs and internal improvements than Jackson's. Even if Clay had wished to align with Crawford over Jackson, which was highly unlikely in any event since Clay's policy differences with Crawford were even deeper, especially on matters of the tariff, and the fact Crawford had been in poor health, no path to victory was evident.

Daniel Pope Cook, Illinois' sole representative, was anti-slavery and gave his support to Adams. James Buchanan attempted to make a compromise with Clay in which Jackson would make him Secretary of State in exchange for his support. Clay instead gave his support to Adams and was able to have the Kentucky, Missouri, and Ohio delegations support him. Illinois, Louisiana, and Maryland, which Jackson won during the election, had their delegations support Adams.

Van Buren attempted to have New York's delegation be divided between Adams and Crawford in order to increase its power and make a deal with one of them. However, Stephen Van Rensselaer, a Federalist allied with Van Buren, voted for Adams. Van Buren stated that Van Rensselaer found a ballot for Adams on the floor while Van Rensselaer, in his letter to Governor DeWitt Clinton, stated that he voted for Adams as he was bound to win and that he wanted to shorten "the long agony". Van Buren supported Jackson during the 1828 election and aided in Calhoun's selection as vice president.

Ignoring the nonbinding directive of the Kentucky legislature that its House delegation choose Jackson, the delegation voted 8–4 for Adams instead. Thus, Adams was elected president on the first ballot, with 13 states, followed by Jackson with seven, and Crawford with four.

Balloting in the contingent election

Aftermath

Adams' victory shocked Jackson, who, as the winner of a plurality of both the popular and electoral votes, expected the House to choose him. Not long before the contingent House election, an anonymous statement appeared in a Philadelphia paper, called the Columbian Observer. The statement, said to be from a member of Congress, essentially accused Clay of selling Adams his support for the office of Secretary of State. No formal investigation was conducted, so the matter was neither confirmed nor denied. When Clay was indeed offered the position after Adams was victorious, he opted to accept and continue to support the administration he voted for, knowing that declining the position would not have helped to dispel the rumors brought against him. Jackson referred to Clay as the "Judas of the West".

By appointing Clay his Secretary of State, President Adams essentially declared him heir to the presidency, as Adams and his three predecessors had all served as Secretary of State. Jackson and his followers accused Adams and Clay of striking a "corrupt bargain", and the Jacksonians would campaign on this claim for the next four years, ultimately helping Jackson defeat Adams in 1828. Ironically, Adams offered Jackson a position in his Cabinet as Secretary of War, which Jackson declined to accept.

Adams' supporters controlled the U.S. House of Representatives after the 1824–25 elections and obtained the speakership for John W. Taylor. Adams' relationship with Calhoun deteriorated, with Calhoun opposing Clay's appointment as Secretary of State due to his own presidential ambitions. In June 1826, Calhoun gave his support to Jackson for the 1828 election.

Electoral College selection

See also
 Contested elections in American history
 United States presidential elections in which the winner lost the popular vote
 1876 United States presidential election
 1888 United States presidential election
 2000 United States presidential election
 2016 United States presidential election

Notes

References

Citations

Sources

 Ammons, Harry. 1959. "James Monroe and the Era of Good Feelings". Virginia Magazine of History and Biography, LXVI, No. 4 (October 1958), pp. 387–398, in Essays on Jacksonian America, Ed. Frank Otto Gatell. New York: Holt, Rinehart and Winston, 1970.
 Brown, Richard H. 1966. "The Missouri Crisis, Slavery, and the Politics of Jacksonianism". South Atlantic Quarterly, pp. 55–72, in Essays on Jacksonian America, Ed. Frank Otto Gatell. New York: Holt, Rinehart and Winston, 1970.
 Dangerfield, George. 1965. The Awakening of American Nationalism: 1815-1828. New York: Harper & Row. online
 
 
 Kolodny, Robin. "The Several Elections of 1824." Congress & the Presidency: A Journal of Capital Studies 23#2 (1996) online.
 Wilentz, Sean. 2008. The Rise of American Democracy: Jefferson to Lincoln. New York: Horton.

Further reading

 

 Kolodny, Robin. "The Several Elections of 1824." Congress & the Presidency 23#2 (1996) online.

 Morgan, William G. “John Quincy Adams Versus Andrew Jackson: Their Biographers And The ‘Corrupt Bargain’ Charge.” Tennessee Historical Quarterly 26#1 (1967), pp. 43–58. online

 Morgan, William G. “Henry Clay’s Biographers and the ‘Corrupt Bargain’ Charge.” Register of the Kentucky Historical Society 66#3 (1968), pp. 242–58. online

 
 Ratcliffe, Donald J. The One-Party Presidential Contest: Adams, Jackson, and 1824's Five-Horse Race (University Press of Kansas, 2015) xiv, 354 pp.
 Murphy, Sharon Ann. "A Not-So-Corrupt Bargain". Review of The One-Party Presidential Contest: Adams, Jackson and 1824's Five-Horse Race by Donald Ratcliffe. Common-place, Vol. 16, No. 4.

External links

 
 Presidential Election of 1824: A Resource Guide from the Library of Congress
 Election of 1824 in Counting the Votes 

 
Presidency of John Quincy Adams
John Quincy Adams
Andrew Jackson
Henry Clay
John C. Calhoun